41st Emmy Awards may refer to:

41st Primetime Emmy Awards, held in 1989
41st Daytime Emmy Awards, held in 2014
41st International Emmy Awards, held in 2016